Plasmodium rhadinurum is a parasite of the genus Plasmodium subgenus Carinamoeba.

Like all Plasmodium species P. rhadinurum has both vertebrate and insect hosts. The vertebrate hosts for this parasite are reptiles.

Description 

The parasite was first described by Thompson and Huff in 1944.

The schizonts give rise to 4 - 8 merozoites.

The gametocytes are round or elongate and may encircle the nucleus.

Distribution 

This species is found in Venezuela.

Hosts 

This species infects the lizard Iguana iguana iguana.

References 

rhadinurum